George Pennefather (28 September 1864 – 16 October 1945) was an Australian cricketer. He played two first-class matches for Tasmania between 1889 and 1897.

See also
 List of Tasmanian representative cricketers

References

External links
 

1864 births
1945 deaths
Australian cricketers
Tasmania cricketers
Cricketers from Launceston, Tasmania